Dria Paola (1909–1993) was an Italian stage and film actress. She played the female lead in Alessandro Blasetti's late silent Sun (1929). In 1930 she starred in the first Italian sound film The Song of Love.

Selected filmography
 Sun (1929)
 The Song of Love (1930)
 The Man with the Claw (1931)
 Lowered Sails (1931)
 Courtyard (1931)
 The Doctor in Spite of Himself (1931)
 Pergolesi (1932)
 Fanny (1933)
 Mr. Desire (1934)
 The Blind Woman of Sorrento (1934)
 Adam's Tree (1936)
 My Song to the Wind (1939)
 The Knight of San Marco (1939)
 The Night of Tricks (1939)

References

Bibliography
 Forgacs, David & Gundle, Stephen. Mass Culture and Italian Society from Fascism to the Cold War. Indiana University Press, 2007.
 Reich, Jacqueline & Garofalo, Piero. Re-Viewing Fascism: Italian Cinema, 1922 to 1943. Indiana University Press, 2002.

External links

1909 births
1993 deaths
Italian silent film actresses
Italian film actresses
Italian stage actresses
People from Rovigo
20th-century Italian actresses